Martin Schwarzschild (May 31, 1912 – April 10, 1997) was a German-American astrophysicist.

Biography
Schwarzschild was born in Potsdam into a distinguished German Jewish academic family. His father was the physicist Karl Schwarzschild and his uncle the astrophysicist Robert Emden. His sister, Agathe Thornton, became a classics scholar in New Zealand.

In line with a request in his father's will, his family moved to Göttingen in 1916. Schwarzschild studied at the University of Göttingen and took his doctoral examination in December 1936. He left Germany in 1936 for Norway and then the United States.
Schwarzschild served in the US army intelligence. He was awarded the Legion of Merit and the Bronze Star for his wartime service. After returning to the US, he married fellow astronomer Barbara
Cherry.
In 1947, Martin Schwarzschild joined his lifelong friend, Lyman Spitzer at Princeton University. Spitzer died 10 days before Schwarzschild.

Schwarzschild's work in the fields of stellar structure and stellar evolution led to improved understanding of pulsating stars, differential solar rotation, post-main sequence evolutionary tracks on the Hertzsprung-Russell diagram (including how stars become red giants), hydrogen shell sources, the helium flash, and the ages of star clusters.  With Fred Hoyle, he computed some of the first stellar models to correctly ascend the red-giant branch by steadily burning hydrogen in a shell around the core.
He and Härm were the first to compute stellar models going through thermal pulses on the asymptotic giant branch and later showed that these models develop convective zones between the helium- and hydrogen-burning shells, which can bring nuclear ashes to the visible surface.
Schwarzschild's 1958 book Structure and Evolution of the Stars taught a generation of astrophysicists how to apply electronic computers to the computation of stellar models.

In the 1950s and ’60s he headed the Stratoscope projects, which took instrumented balloons to unprecedented heights.
The first Stratoscope produced high resolution images of solar granules and sunspots, confirming the existence of convection in the solar atmosphere, and the second obtained infrared spectra of planets, red giant stars, and the nuclei of galaxies. In his later years he made significant contributions toward understanding the dynamics of elliptical galaxies. Schwarzschild was renowned as a teacher and held major leadership positions in several scientific societies.

In the 1980s, Schwarzschild applied his numerical skills to building models for triaxial galaxies.

Schwarzschild was the Eugene Higgins Professor Emeritus of Astronomy at Princeton University, where he spent most of his professional life.

Honors

Awards
Karl Schwarzschild Medal (1959)
Henry Norris Russell Lectureship (1960)
Henry Draper Medal of the National Academy of Sciences (1960)
Eddington Medal (1963)
Bruce Medal (1965)
Rittenhouse Medal (1966)
Gold Medal of the Royal Astronomical Society (1969)
Brouwer Award (1992)
Balzan Prize (1994, with Fred Hoyle)
National Medal of Science (1997)

Memberships 

 American Academy of Arts and Sciences (1954)
 United States National Academy of Sciences (1956)
 American Philosophical Society (1981)

Named after him
Asteroid 4463 Marschwarzschild

See also
 Stratoscope
 Perhapsatron
 Betelgeuse
 Interchange instability

References

External links
Published papers of Martin Schwarzschild on SAO/NASA Astrophysics Data System
D. Merritt, Martin Schwarzschild's Contributions to Galaxy Dynamics
 Oral history interview with Martin Schwarzschild, 4 sessions, 1977. Niels Bohr Library, American Institute of Physics, College Park, MD. 
Oral history interview with Martin Schwarzschild, 1986.  Charles Babbage Institute, University of Minnesota, Minneapolis.

1912 births
1997 deaths
20th-century American astronomers
American astrophysicists
Foreign Members of the Royal Society
Members of the United States National Academy of Sciences
German astrophysicists
20th-century German physicists
Jewish emigrants from Nazi Germany to the United States
Jewish American scientists
Jewish physicists
National Medal of Science laureates
Scientists from Potsdam
Recipients of the Gold Medal of the Royal Astronomical Society
Recipients of the Legion of Merit
20th-century American Jews
Members of the American Philosophical Society